National Science Day is celebrated in India on February 28 each year to mark the discovery of the Raman effect by Indian physicist Sir C. V. Raman on 28 February 1928.

For his discovery, Sir C.V. Raman was awarded the Nobel Prize in Physics in 1930.

History of National Science Day 
In 1986, the National Council for Science and Technology Communication (NCSTC) asked the Government of India to designate February 28 as National Science Day. The event is now celebrated all over India in schools, colleges, universities and other academic, scientific, technical, medical and research institutions. On the occasion of the first NSD (National Science Day)(26 February 2020) NCSTC announced the institution of the National Science Popularization awards for recognizing outstanding efforts in the area of science and communication.

Celebration of National Science Day 
On the occasion of national science day includes many activities like conducting events in schools and colleges on this day.

Celebration of India Space Week 
India Space Week is celebrated in India every year on 12 to 18 August. The celebration also includes public speeches, radio, TV, Space science movies, Space science exhibitions based on themes and concepts, debates, quiz competitions, lectures, science model exhibitions and many more activities.

Indian Space Week consists of space education and outreach events held by space agencies, aerospace companies, schools, Collage, University, NGO, planetarium, museums, and astronomy clubs around the National in a common timeframe. India Space Week is coordinated by the India Nation with the support of the India Space Week Association (ISWA). The ISWA leads a global team of National Coordinators, who promote the celebration of India Space Week within their own countries. The ISA AND IICT declared in 2022 that India Space Week will be held each year on the Celebration of birth of 12-18 august Vikram Sarabhai.

Objectives of Celebrating National Science Day 
National Science Day is celebrated to spread a message about the importance of science used in the daily life of the people. To display all the activities, efforts and achievements in the field of science for human welfare. It is celebrated to discuss all the issues and implement new technologies for the development in the field of  science. To give an opportunity to the scientific minded citizens in India. To encourage the people as well as popularize science and technology.

Themes of National Science Day 

The theme of the year 1999 was “Our Changing Earth”.

The theme of the year 2000 was “Recreating Interest in Basic Science”.

The theme of the year 2001 was “Information Technology for Science Education”.

The theme of the year 2002 was “Wealth From Waste”.

The theme of the year 2003 was “50 years of DNA & 25 years of IVF – The Blue print of Life”.

The theme of the year 2004 was “Encouraging Scientific Awareness in Community”.

The theme of the year 2005 was “Celebrating Physics”.

The theme of the year 2006 was “Nurture Nature for our future”.

The theme of the year 2007 was “More Crop Per Drop”.

The theme of the year 2008 was “Understanding the Planet Earth”.

The theme of the year 2009 was “Expanding Horizons of Science”.

The theme of the year 2010 was “Gender Equity, Science & Technology for Sustainable Development”.

The theme of the year 2011 was “Chemistry in Daily Life”.

The theme of the year 2012 was “Clean Energy Options and Nuclear Safety”.

The theme of the year 2013 was “Genetically Modified Crops and Food Security”.

The theme of the year 2014 was “Fostering Scientific Temper”.

The theme of the year 2015 was “Science for Nation Building”.

The theme of the year 2016 was on "Scientific Issues for Development of the Nation".

The theme of the year 2017 was "Science and Technology for Specially Abled Persons"

The theme of the year 2018 was "Science and Technology for a sustainable future."

The theme of the year 2019 was "Science for the People, and the People for Science"

The theme of the year 2020 was "Women in Science."

The theme of the year 2021 was 'Future of STI: Impact on Education Skills and Work'.

The theme for NSD of the year 2022 is 'Integrated Approach in S&T for Sustainable Future'.

The theme for National science Day celebrated on 28th February 2023 is "Global Science for Global Wellbeing".
https://dst.gov.in/union-minister-dr-jitendra-singh-unveils-theme-national-science-day-2023-titled-global-science

On 28 February 2009, five institutions in India  were presented the 'National Award for Science Communication' by the Indian Department of Science and Technology (IDST). These awards are presented to recognize the efforts of individuals and government and non-government bodies for the popularization of science in India.

The highest award was given in 2009 to the Vikram Sarabhai Community Science Centre for its contribution to science-related learning material and conducting training programs on science education.

A Festival of Measurement and Space Fair was held at the Nehru Planetarium, New Delhi.

Dr. Pramod Kumar Mohapatra, G.S. Unnikrishnan Nair and Ms. Meenu Khare were awarded 1,00,000 for their individual contributions to the field. Jidnyasa Trust of Thane also received 1,00,000 for setting up a science activity center. It is to make people aware about the science and technology.

2012 
The focal theme for 2012 National Science Day was “Clean Energy Options And Nuclear Safety” 
As India observed National Science Day on 28 February, the citizens saw a slew of activities at Science City which had planned a five-day Science Carnival on theme of youth and science.

"The Science Carnival is going to be an event with a series of scientific activities and programs involving school and college students, eminent scientists and faculties of the state and country. We want to provide a real platform for budding scientists to make their career and profession in science," said a senior Science City official. Officials said that they are expecting nearly 1 Lakh students and science enthusiasts to visit Science City during this period.

 India Space Week
 National Mathematics Year
 National Mathematics Day
 National Science Week
 National Council of Science Museums

References 

February observances
Science and technology in India
Observances in India
Observances about science